The Interception of Communications Commissioner was a regulatory official in the United Kingdom, appointed under section 57 of the Regulation of Investigatory Powers Act 2000, and previously under section 8 of the Interception of Communications Act 1985.

The Interception of Communications Commissioner ensured that government agencies acted in accordance with their legal responsibilities when intercepting communications. The Commissioner also reviewed the role of the Home Secretary in issuing interception warrants.

The Interception of Communications Commissioner has been replaced by the Investigatory Powers Commissioner by the Investigatory Powers Act 2016.

Commissioners
1985–1992: Sir Anthony Lloyd
1992–1994: Sir Thomas Bingham
1994–2000: Lord Nolan
2000–2006: Sir Swinton Thomas
2006–2012: Sir Paul Kennedy	
2013–2015: Sir Anthony May
Sir Paul Kennedy served as interim Interception of Communications Commissioner during Sir Anthony May's absence July through December 2014.
2015–2017: Sir Stanley Burnton

See also 

 Intelligence Services Commissioner
 Information Commissioner's Office

References

Government of the United Kingdom
Telecommunications organisations in the United Kingdom